Julia Abe (born 21 May 1976) is a former professional tennis player from Germany.

Biography
A right-handed player from Bielefeld, Abe was coached during her career by her father Wolfgang.

Abe turned professional at the age of 19 and won two ITF singles titles in her first year on the ITF circuit in 1996.

Her best performances on the WTA Tour were quarterfinals appearances at the 1998 Intersport Grand Prix in Hamburg and the 1999 Nokia Cup in Prostějov, both as a qualifier.

Ranked a career best 111 in the world at the beginning of 2000, she received direct entry into the Australian Open main draw, where she lost in the first round to Arantxa Sánchez Vicario.

At the 2000 French Open she had to compete in qualifying and made her way through to the main draw. She defeated Marion Maruska in the first round, then challenged top seed Martina Hingis in the second round, before going down 4–6, 5–7, having served for the second set. This was her final appearance on tour.

ITF finals

Singles (3–3)

Doubles (4–1)

References

External links
 
 

1976 births
Living people
German female tennis players
Sportspeople from Bielefeld
Tennis people from North Rhine-Westphalia